Aldabe is a surname. Notable people with the surname include:

Carlos Aldabe (1919–1998), Argentine footballer and manager
Ricardo Aldabe (born 1965), Spanish swimmer